Grzegorz Nowak (born 15 August 1951, Poznań) is a Polish conductor. He has served as music director of the Polish National Opera, the Edmonton Symphony Orchestra, the SWR Radio Orchestra in Kaiserslautern, Germany), and Sinfonia Helvetica and festival Musique and Amitié in Switzerland. He is the Principal Associate Conductor of the Royal Philharmonic Orchestra in London.

Biography 
Born in Poznań, Poland, he began his international conducting career by winning the first prize at the Ernest Ansermet Conducting Competition in Geneva. He also won the Grand Prix Patek Philippe, Rolex Prize, Swiss Prize, American Patronage Prize and the Europäische Förderpreis für Musik as the European Musician of the Year. Nowak was honoured with the Distinguished Teacher Award during his tenure as Professor at the BGSU University in Ohio, and the title of "Honorary Professor" was bestowed upon him by the University of Alberta.

After studying conducting, composition and violin at the Music Academy in Poznań, Nowak was awarded a doctorate fellowship at the Eastman School of Music. He honed his skills at Tanglewood on a Serge Koussevitzky Fellowship with such masters as Leonard Bernstein, Seiji Ozawa, Erich Leinsdorf and Igor Markevitch, before assisting Kurt Masur with the New York Philharmonic Orchestra.

In Europe Nowak has worked as a conductor with the Royal Philharmonic Orchestra, London Symphony Orchestra, Monte-Carlo Philharmonic Orchestra, Orchestre National de France, Orchestre Lamoureaux in Paris, Orchestra dell'Accademia Nazionale di Santa Cecilia in Rome, RAI orchestras in Milan, Rome and Turin, Orchestre de la Suisse Romande in Geneva, Tonhalle Orchestra in Zürich, National Orchestra of Belgium, Luxembourg Philharmonic Orchestra, Warsaw Philharmonic Orchestra, National Orchestra of Spain and the Gulbenkian Orchestra in Lisbon. He has also conducted many times in Scandinavia, performing with the philharmonic and radio orchestras of Oslo, Stockholm, Helsinki and Copenhagen.

In North America, Nowak has conducted the Montreal Symphony, Vancouver Symphony, Baltimore Symphony, Cincinnati Symphony, Carmel Symphony, San Diego Symphony, Buffalo Philharmonic orchestras and the Xalapa Symphony in Mexico. He has also earned critical acclaim for his performances in the Far East and elsewhere with the Philharmonic and Yomiuri Orchestras in Tokyo, Hong Kong Philharmonic, Taipei Philharmonic in Taiwan and the Jerusalem Symphony Orchestra.

Nowak has conducted operatic productions in Italy, Monte Carlo, Switzerland, Germany, Poland, the United Kingdom, Sweden, the United States and Canada, including works by Mozart (The Marriage of Figaro, Don Giovanni, Il Seraglio, Così fan Tutte, The Magic Flute), Rossini (The Barber of Seville, Semiramide), Beethoven (Fidelio), Bizet (Carmen), Borodin (Prince Igor), Moniuszko (Halka, Haunted Manor), Verdi (Otello, Don Carlos and the Polish première of Simon Boccanegra) and Puccini (Madam Butterfly, La bohème, Turandot and Tosca – including a tour with Welsh National Opera). His production of Debussy's Le Martyre de Saint Sébastien was broadcast live from Rome on the Eurovision television network. He received rave reviews at the 2006 Internationale Maifestspiele Wiesbaden for conducting Giordano's Andrea Chénier, a co-production of the Polish National Opera with Plácido Domingo and the National Opera in Washington.

His recordings have been highly acclaimed by the press and public alike, winning many awards. Diapason in Paris praised his KOS CD with Martha Argerich and Sinfonia Varsovia as 'indispensable... un must', and the second edition of this recording won the Fryderyk Award. The Polish Symphonic Music of the 19th Century recording with Sinfonia Varsovia won the CD of the Year Award, a nomination for the Fryderyk Award and the Bronze Bell Award in Singapore. The American Record Guide praised Nowak's Gallo label CD of Frank Martin Violin Concerto with Piotr Milewski and the Biel Symphony as 'by far the best'. Chopin's piano concerti with Janusz Olejniczak and Sinfonia Varsovia won the Fryderyk and CD of the Year awards, and his CD with Stanislaw Drzewiecki and Sinfonia Varsovia was also nominated for the Fryderyk Award. His Haenssler-classic disc with Anja Silja won two Classical Internet Awards, and his recording of Czerny Symphonies No. 2 and 6 (world premiere recording) received critical acclaim around the world. His CBC record with the Edmonton Symphony Orchestra and Amanda Forsyth won the Juno Award, the CD-Accord recording with Joanna Kozłowska and the Poznań Philharmonic was hailed as 'superb' and Gramophone Magazine praised his ASV recording with the London Symphony Orchestra as 'outstanding'.

Nowak has performed alongside soloists, including pianists Vladimir Ashkenazy, Angela Hewitt and Anton Kuerti. He has performed many times with Krystian Zimerman, including tours in Switzerland, Italy and Spain. He has accompanied violinists Nigel Kennedy, Adam Taubitz, Joseph Silverstein and Pinchas Zukerman, among others. Nowak has worked with several cellists, including Ofra Harnoy and Mstislav Rostropovich. He has collaborated with singers, including Ben Heppner, Marilyn Horne, Gwyneth Jones, Kathleen Battle, Ewa Podles and the Swingle Singers.

Discography

References

External links
Edmonton Symphony Orchestra
Biography on the site of National Opera in Warsaw
Biography on the official site of Grzegorz Nowak
Biography on the site of Polskie Centrum Informacji Muzycznej
Biography on the site kamerton
Sinfonia Varsovia
Biel Symphony Orchestra
Orchestre de Bretagne
Gävle Symphony
Deutsches Kammerorchester

1951 births
Living people
Musicians from Poznań
Polish conductors (music)
Male conductors (music)
20th-century Polish musicians
20th-century conductors (music)
21st-century Polish musicians
21st-century conductors (music)
20th-century male musicians
21st-century male musicians